Jiri is a village in Nepal.

Jiri may also refer to:

 Jiri-ye Sofla, a village in Iran
 Jiří (disambiguation), the Czech name for George
 Jairos Jiri (1921–1982), Zimbabwean philanthropist
 Jiri River, a river in Assam, India

See also